We Can Do Whatever is the debut album by American singing duo Otis & Shug. Although it was scheduled to be released August 29, 1995 on Interscope Records, the album was shelved until it finally was released January 18, 2005, on Expansion Records. It was produced by Raphael Saadiq. One single, "Journey", peaked at number 60 on the 1996 Billboard Hot R&B/Hip-Hop Songs. It features guest performances by Raphael Saadiq.

Track listing 
"Journey" – 5:04
"Fantasy" – 3:36
"If You Want It" – 4:29
"My First Mistake" – 4:38
"My Choice" – 6:29
"Thank You for My Baby" – 5:22
"Right on Track" – 5:10
"What Does It Take" – 4:41
"Never Known" (featuring Raphael Saadiq) – 3:49
"Something Inside of Me" – 4:32
"Peace of Mind" – 3:20
"This Is My Phone Call" – 5:04
"Interlude" – 0:55
"Round and Round" – 4:27
"Indiana" – 5:24
"Goodbye" (Alt Phone) – 5:09

Chart history

Personnel 

David "Shug" Cooper - Performer
Otis Cooper - Performer
Ralph Tee - Liner Notes
Raphael Saadiq - Producer
Roger Williams His Piano and Orchestra - Design

References

External links 
[ We Can Do Whatever] at Allmusic
We Can Do Whatever at Discogs
We Can Do Whatever at Tower Records

2005 debut albums
Albums produced by Raphael Saadiq
Interscope Records albums